The 2014 Asian Men's U20 Volleyball Championship was held in Manama, Bahrain from 17 to 25 October 2014. 20 teams entered for the tournament which 2 of them withdrew.

Pools composition
Teams were seeded in the first three positions of each pool following the Serpentine system according to their final standing of the 2012 edition. AVC reserved the right to seed the hosts as head of Pool A regardless of the final standing of the 2012 edition. All teams not seeded were drawn. Final standing of the 2012 edition are shown in brackets except Hosts.

* Withdrew

Preliminary round
All times are Arabia Standard Time (UTC+03:00).

Pool A

|}

|}

Pool B

|}

|}

Pool C

|}

|}

Pool D

|}

|}

Final round
All times are Arabia Standard Time (UTC+03:00).

17th–18th places

|}

9th–16th places

9th–16th quarterfinals

|}

13th–16th semifinals

|}

9th–12th semifinals

|}

15th place match

|}

13th place match

|}

11th place match

|}

9th place match

|}

Final eight

Quarterfinals

|}

5th–8th semifinals

|}

Semifinals

|}

7th place match

|}

5th place match

|}

3rd place match

|}

Final

|}

Final standing

Awards

Most Valuable Player
 Mohammad Javad Manavinejad
Best Setter
 Yu Yaochen
Best Outside Spikers
 Akbar Valaei
 Xia Runtao

Best Middle Blockers
 Sahand Allah Verdian
 Zhang Zhejia
Best Opposite Spiker
 Mohamed Anan
Best Libero
 Lee Sang-uk

References

External links
Regulations
Squads

Asian Men's U20 Volleyball Championship
Asian Cup
V
V
Asian Junior
Asian Men's U20 Volleyball Championship